The 16th United States Congress was a meeting of the legislative branch of the United States federal government, consisting of the United States Senate and the United States House of Representatives. It met in Washington, D.C. from March 4, 1819, to March 4, 1821, during the third and fourth years of James Monroe's presidency.  The apportionment of seats in the House of Representatives was based on the 1810 United States census. Both chambers had a Democratic-Republican majority.

Major events

 A "speech for Buncombe County, North Carolina" given by North Carolina representative Felix Walker in 1820 was credited with introducing into the language the term "bunkum".
 March 6, 1819: McCulloch v. Maryland: Supreme Court ruled that the Bank of the United States is constitutional.
 July 3, 1820: United States House of Representatives elections, 1820 began in Louisiana
 August 7, 1820: 1820 United States Census conducted, eventually determining a population of 9,638,453, of which 1,538,022 were slaves.
 November 13–15, 1820: A special election for the House speakership takes 22 ballots.
 December 3, 1820: U.S. presidential election, 1820: James Monroe was re-elected, virtually unopposed.

Major legislation 

 March 6, 1820: Missouri Compromise, Sess. 1, ch. 22, 
 April 24, 1820: Land Act of 1820, Sess. 1, ch. 51,

Proposed but not enacted 
 Tallmadge Amendment would allow Missouri into the Union as a slave state, but would also implement gradual emancipation in Missouri.  The amendment passed the House of Representatives, but not the Senate.   The Tallmadge Amendment led to the passage of the Missouri Compromise.

Treaties 
February 22, 1819: Adams-Onís Treaty (Transcontinental Treaty of 1819): Spain ceded Florida to the United States.

States admitted
 December 14, 1819: Alabama was admitted as the 22nd state, .
 March 15, 1820: Maine was admitted as the 23rd state. It was formerly the District of Maine, part of Massachusetts, .

Party summary
The count below identifies party affiliations at the beginning of the first session of this congress. Changes resulting from subsequent replacements are shown below in the "Changes in membership" section.

Senate 
During this congress, two Senate seats were added for each of the new states of Alabama and Maine.

House of Representatives
During this congress, one House seat was added for the new state of Alabama and one seat was reapportioned from Massachusetts to the new state of Maine. For the beginning of the next congress, six more seats from Massachusetts would be reapportioned to Maine.

Leadership

Senate
President: Daniel D. Tompkins (DR)
President pro tempore: James Barbour, (DR), until December 26, 1819
 John Gaillard, (DR), elected January 25, 1820

House of Representatives
Speaker: Henry Clay (DR), resigned October 28, 1820
 John Taylor, (DR), elected November 15, 1820, on the 22nd ballot

Members
This list is arranged by chamber, then by state. Senators are listed by class and representatives are listed by district.

Skip to House of Representatives, below

Senate
Senators were elected by the state legislatures every two years, with one-third beginning new six-year terms with each Congress. Preceding the names in the list below are Senate class numbers, which indicate the cycle of their election. In this Congress, Class 1 meant their term ended with this Congress, requiring re-election in 1820; Class 2 meant their term began in the last Congress, requiring re-election in 1822; and Class 3 meant their term began in this Congress, requiring re-election in 1824.

Alabama 
 2. William R. King (DR), from December 14, 1819 (newly admitted state)
 3. John W. Walker (DR), from December 14, 1819 (newly admitted state)

Connecticut 
 1. Samuel W. Dana (F)
 3. James Lanman (DR)

Delaware 
 1. Outerbridge Horsey (F)
 2. Nicholas Van Dyke (F)

Georgia 
 2. Freeman Walker (DR), from November 6, 1819
 3. John Elliott (DR)

Illinois 
 2. Jesse B. Thomas (DR)
 3. Ninian Edwards (DR)

Indiana 
 1. James Noble (DR)
 3. Waller Taylor (DR)

Kentucky 
 2. Richard M. Johnson (DR), from December 10, 1819
 3. William Logan (DR), until May 28, 1820
 Isham Talbot (DR), from October 19, 1820

Louisiana 
 2. Henry Johnson (DR)
 3. James Brown (DR)

Maine 
 1. John Holmes (DR), from June 13, 1820 (newly admitted state)
 2. John Chandler (DR), from June 14, 1820 (newly admitted state)

Maryland 
 1. Alexander C. Hanson (F), until April 23, 1819
 William Pinkney (DR), from December 21, 1819
 3. Edward Lloyd (DR), from December 21, 1819

Massachusetts 
 1. Prentiss Mellen (F), until May 15, 1820
 Elijah H. Mills (F), from June 12, 1820
 2. Harrison Gray Otis (F)

Mississippi 
 1. Walter Leake (DR), until May 15, 1820
 David Holmes (DR), from August 30, 1820
 2. Thomas H. Williams (DR)

New Hampshire 
 2. David L. Morril (DR)
 3. John F. Parrott (DR)

New Jersey 
 1. James J. Wilson (DR), until January 8, 1821
 Samuel L. Southard (DR), from January 26, 1821
 2. Mahlon Dickerson (DR)

New York 
 1. Nathan Sanford (DR)
 3. Rufus King (F), from January 25, 1820

North Carolina 
 2. Montfort Stokes (DR)
 3. Nathaniel Macon (DR)

Ohio 
 1. Benjamin Ruggles (DR)
 3. William A. Trimble (DR)

Pennsylvania 
 1. Jonathan Roberts (DR)
 3. Walter Lowrie (DR)

Rhode Island 
 1. William Hunter (F)
 2. James Burrill Jr. (F), until December 25, 1820
 Nehemiah R. Knight (DR), from January 9, 1821

South Carolina 
 2. William Smith (DR)
 3. John Gaillard (DR)

Tennessee 
 1. John H. Eaton (DR)
 2. John Williams (DR)

Vermont 
 1. Isaac Tichenor (F)
 3. William A. Palmer (DR)

Virginia 
 1. James Barbour (DR)
 2. John W. Eppes (DR), until December 4, 1819
 James Pleasants (DR), from December 10, 1819

House of Representatives

Alabama 
 . John Crowell (DR), from December 14, 1819 (newly admitted state)

Connecticut 
All representatives were elected statewide on a general ticket.
 . Henry W. Edwards (DR)
 . Samuel A. Foote (DR)
 . Jonathan O. Moseley (DR)
 . Elisha Phelps (DR)
 . John Russ (DR)
 . James Stevens (DR)
 . Gideon Tomlinson (DR)

Delaware 
Both representatives were elected statewide on a general ticket.
 . Willard Hall (DR), until January 22, 1821, vacant thereafter
 . Louis McLane (F)

Georgia 
All representatives were elected statewide on a general ticket.
 . Joel Abbot (DR)
 . Thomas W. Cobb (DR)
 . Joel Crawford (DR)
 . John A. Cuthbert (DR)
 . Robert R. Reid (DR)
 . William Terrell (DR)

Illinois 
 . Daniel P. Cook (DR)

Indiana 
 . William Hendricks (DR)

Kentucky 
 . David Trimble (DR)
 . Henry Clay (DR)
 . William Brown (DR)
 . Thomas Metcalfe (DR)
 . Alney McLean (DR)
 . David Walker (DR), until March 1, 1820
 Francis Johnson (DR), from November 13, 1820
 . George Robertson (DR)
 . Richard C. Anderson Jr. (DR)
 . Tunstal Quarles (DR), until June 15, 1820
 Thomas Montgomery (DR), from November 13, 1820
 . Benjamin Hardin (DR)

Louisiana 
 . Thomas Butler (DR)

Maine 
 . Joseph Dane (F), seated December 11, 1820 (newly admitted state)

Maryland 
The 5th district was a plural district with two representatives.
 . Raphael Neale (F)
 . Joseph Kent (DR)
 . Henry R. Warfield (F)
 . Samuel Ringgold (DR)
 . Peter Little (DR)
 . Samuel Smith (DR)
 . Stevenson Archer (DR)
 . Thomas Culbreth (DR)
 . Thomas Bayly (F)

Massachusetts 
 . Jonathan Mason (F), until May 15, 1820
 Benjamin Gorham (DR), from November 27, 1820
 . Nathaniel Silsbee (DR)
 . Jeremiah Nelson (F)
 . Timothy Fuller (DR)
 . Samuel Lathrop (F)
 . Samuel C. Allen (F)
 . Henry Shaw (DR)
 . Zabdiel Sampson (DR), until July 26, 1820
 Aaron Hobart (DR), from December 18, 1820
 . Walter Folger Jr. (DR)
 . Marcus Morton (DR)
 . Benjamin Adams (F)
 . Jonas Kendall (F)
 . Edward Dowse (DR), until May 26, 1820
 William Eustis (DR), from November 13, 1820
 . John Holmes (DR), until March 15, 1820, vacant thereafter
 . Ezekiel Whitman (F)
 . Mark L. Hill (DR)
 . Martin Kinsley (DR)
 . James Parker (DR)
 . Joshua Cushman (DR)
 . Enoch Lincoln (DR)

Mississippi 
 . Christopher Rankin (DR)

New Hampshire 
All representatives were elected statewide on a general ticket.
 . Joseph Buffum Jr. (DR)
 . Josiah Butler (DR)
 . Clifton Clagett (DR)
 . Arthur Livermore (DR)
 . William Plumer Jr. (DR)
 . Nathaniel Upham (DR)

New Jersey 
All representatives were elected statewide on a general ticket.
 . Ephraim Bateman (DR)
 . Joseph Bloomfield (DR)
 . John Condit (DR), until November 4, 1819
 Charles Kinsey (DR), from February 16, 1820
 . John Linn (DR), until January 5, 1821, vacant thereafter
 . Bernard Smith (DR)
 . Henry Southard (DR)

New York 
There were six plural districts, the 1st, 2nd, 12th, 15th, 20th & 21st, each had two representatives.
 . James Guyon Jr. (DR), from January 14, 1820
 . Silas Wood (F)
 . Henry Meigs (DR)
 . Peter H. Wendover (DR)
 . Caleb Tompkins (DR)
 . Randall S. Street (F)
 . James Strong (F)
 . Walter Case (DR)
 . Jacob H. De Witt (DR)
 . Robert Clark (DR)
 . Solomon Van Rensselaer (F)
 . John D. Dickinson (F)
 . John W. Taylor (DR)
 . Ezra C. Gross (DR)
 . Nathaniel Pitcher (DR)
 . Harmanus Peek (DR)
 . John Fay (DR)
 . Joseph S. Lyman (DR)
 . Robert Monell (DR)
 . Henry R. Storrs (F)
 . Aaron Hackley Jr. (DR)
 . William D. Ford (DR)
 . George Hall (DR)
 . Caleb Baker (DR)
 . Jonathan Richmond (DR)
 . Nathaniel Allen (DR)
 . Albert H. Tracy (DR)

North Carolina 
 . Lemuel Sawyer (DR)
 . Hutchins G. Burton (DR), from December 6, 1819
 . Thomas H. Hall (DR)
 . Jesse Slocumb (F), until December 20, 1820
 William S. Blackledge (DR), from February 7, 1821
 . Charles Hooks (DR)
 . Weldon N. Edwards (DR)
 . John Culpepper (F)
 . James S. Smith (DR)
 . Thomas Settle (DR)
 . Charles Fisher (DR)
 . William Davidson (F)
 . Felix Walker (DR)
 . Lewis Williams (DR)

Ohio 
 . Thomas R. Ross (DR)
 . John W. Campbell (DR)
 . Henry Brush (DR)
 . Samuel Herrick (DR)
 . Philemon Beecher (F)
 . John Sloane (DR)

Pennsylvania 
There were six plural districts, the 2nd, 3rd, 5th, 6th & 10th had two representatives each, the 1st had four representatives.
 . Samuel Edwards (F)
 . Thomas Forrest (F)
 . Joseph Hemphill (F)
 . John Sergeant (F)
 . William Darlington (DR)
 . Samuel Gross (DR)
 . Jacob Hibshman (DR)
 . James M. Wallace (DR)
 . Jacob Hostetter (DR)
 . Andrew Boden (DR)
 . David Fullerton (DR), until May 15, 1820
 Thomas G. McCullough (F), from November 13, 1820
 . Samuel Moore (DR)
 . Thomas J. Rogers (DR)
 . Joseph Hiester (DR), until December 1820
 Daniel Udree (DR), from January 8, 1821
 . Robert Philson (DR)
 . William P. Maclay (DR)
 . George Denison (DR)
 . John Murray (DR)
 . David Marchand (DR)
 . Thomas Patterson (DR)
 . Christian Tarr (DR)
 . Henry Baldwin (DR)
 . Robert Moore (DR)

Rhode Island 
Both representatives were elected statewide on a general ticket.
 . Samuel Eddy (DR)
 . Nathaniel Hazard (DR), until December 17, 1820; vacant thereafter

South Carolina 
 . Charles Pinckney (DR)
 . William Lowndes (DR)
 . James Ervin (DR)
 . James Overstreet (DR)
 . Starling Tucker (DR)
 . Eldred Simkins (DR)
 . Elias Earle (DR)
 . John McCreary (DR)
 . Joseph Brevard (DR)

Tennessee 
 . John Rhea (DR)
 . John Cocke (DR)
 . Francis Jones (DR)
 . Robert Allen (DR)
 . Newton Cannon (DR)
 . Henry H. Bryan (DR)

Vermont 
All representatives were elected statewide on a general ticket.
 . Samuel C. Crafts (DR)
 . Ezra Meech (DR)
 . Orsamus C. Merrill (DR), until January 12, 1820
 Rollin C. Mallary (DR), from January 13, 1820
 . Charles Rich (DR)
 . Mark Richards (DR)
 . William Strong (DR)

Virginia 
 . James Pindall (F), until July 26, 1820
 Edward B. Jackson (DR), from November 13, 1820
 . Thomas Van Swearingen (F)
 . Jared Williams (DR)
 . William McCoy (DR)
 . John Floyd (DR)
 . Alexander Smyth (DR)
 . Ballard Smith (DR)
 . Charles F. Mercer (F)
 . William Lee Ball (DR)
 . George F. Strother (DR), until February 10, 1820
 Thomas L. Moore (DR), from November 13, 1820
 . Philip P. Barbour (DR)
 . Robert S. Garnett (DR)
 . Severn E. Parker (DR)
 . William A. Burwell (DR), until February 16, 1821, vacant for remainder of term
 . George Tucker (DR)
 . John Randolph (DR)
 . James Pleasants (DR), until December 14, 1819
 William S. Archer (DR), from January 18, 1820
 . Mark Alexander (DR)
 . James Jones (DR)
 . James Johnson (DR), until February 1, 1820
 John C. Gray (DR), from November 13, 1820
 . Thomas Newton Jr. (DR)
 . Hugh Nelson (DR)
 . John Tyler (DR)

Non-voting members 
 : Vacant until statehood
 . James W. Bates, from December 21, 1819
 .  William Woodbridge, until August 9, 1820
 Solomon Sibley, from November 20, 1820
 . John Scott

Changes in membership 
The count below reflects changes from the beginning of this Congress.

Senate 
There were 5 resignations, 2 deaths, 2 vacancies before the Congress, and 4 new seats. The Democratic-Republicans had a 7-seat net gain and the Federalists had a 1-seat net loss.

|-
| Georgia(2)
| Vacant
| style="font-size:80%" | John Forsyth had resigned before the beginning of the Congress.
|  | Freeman Walker (DR)
| Elected November 6, 1819
|-
| Kentucky(2)
| Vacant
| style="font-size:80%" | John J. Crittenden had resigned before the beginning of the Congress.
|  | Richard Mentor Johnson (DR)
| Elected December 10, 1819
|-
| Maryland(3)
| Vacant
| style="font-size:80%" | Legislature did not elect until after the term began.
|  | Edward Lloyd (DR)
| Elected December 14, 1819, and qualified December 21, 1819
|-
| New York(3)
| Vacant
| style="font-size:80%" | Legislature failed to elect, held late election.
|  | Rufus King (F)
| Elected January 8, 1820, and qualified January 25, 1820
|-
| Maryland(1)
|  | Alexander C. Hanson (F)
| style="font-size:80%" | Died April 23, 1819
|  | William Pinkney (DR)
| Elected December 21, 1819
|-
| Virginia(2)
|  | John W. Eppes (DR)
| style="font-size:80%" | Resigned December 4, 1819
|  | James Pleasants (DR)
| Elected December 10, 1819
|-
| Alabama(2)
| rowspan=2 | New seats
| rowspan=2  style="font-size:80%" | Alabama was admitted to the Union December 14, 1819.
|  | John W. Walker (DR)
| Elected December 14, 1819
|-
| Alabama(3)
|  | William R. King (DR)
| Elected December 14, 1819
|-
| Maine(2)
| rowspan=2 | New seats
| rowspan=2 style="font-size:80%" |Maine was admitted to the Union March 15, 1820.
|  | John Holmes (DR)
| Elected June 13, 1820
|-
| Maine(1)
|  | John Chandler (DR)
| Elected June 14, 1820
|-
| Massachusetts(1)
|  | Prentiss Mellen (F)
| style="font-size:80%" | Resigned May 15, 1820
|  | Elijah H. Mills (F)
| Elected June 12, 1820
|-
| Mississippi(1)
|  | Walter Leake (DR)
| style="font-size:80%" | Resigned May 15, 1820, after becoming US Marshal for Mississippi
|  | David Holmes (DR)
| Appointed August 30, 1820
|-
| Kentucky(3)
|  | William Logan (DR)
| style="font-size:80%" | Resigned May 28, 1820, to run for Governor of Kentucky
|  | Isham Talbot (DR)
| Elected October 19, 1820
|-
| Rhode Island(2)
|  | James Burrill Jr. (F)
| style="font-size:80%" | Died December 25, 1820
|  | Nehemiah R. Knight (DR)
| Elected January 9, 1821
|-
| New Jersey(1)
|  | James J. Wilson (DR)
| style="font-size:80%" | Resigned January 8, 1821
|  | Samuel L. Southard (DR)
| Appointed January 26, 1821
|}

House of Representatives 

There were 13 resignations, 5 deaths, 2 contested elections, and 2 new seats.  The Democratic-Republicans had a 1-seat net gain and the Federalists had no net change.

|-
| 
| Vacant
| style="font-size:80%" |
|  | Hutchins G. Burton (DR)
| Seated December 6, 1819
|-
| 
| rowspan=2 | Vacant
| rowspan=2 style="font-size:80%" | Seat remained vacant until statehood
| rowspan=2  | John Crowell (DR)
| rowspan=2 | Seated December 14, 1819
|-
| 
|-
| 
| Vacant
| style="font-size:80%" | Arkansas Territory organized July 4, 1819
| James W. Bates
| Seated December 21, 1819
|-
| 
| Vacant
| style="font-size:80%" | Contested election. Representative-elect Ebenezer Sage never qualified.
|  | James Guyon Jr. (DR)
| Seated January 14, 1820
|-
| 
|  | John Condit (DR)
| style="font-size:80%" | Resigned November 4, 1819
|  | Charles Kinsey (DR)
| Seated February 16, 1820
|-
| 
|  | James Pleasants (DR)
| style="font-size:80%" | Resigned December 14, 1819
|  | William S. Archer (DR)
| Seated January 18, 1820
|-
| 
|  | Orsamus C. Merrill (DR)
| style="font-size:80%" | Contested election, served until January 12, 1820
|  | Rollin C. Mallary (DR)
| Seated January 13, 1820
|-
| 
|  | James Johnson (DR)
| style="font-size:80%" | Resigned February 1, 1820
|  | John C. Gray (DR)
| Seated November 13, 1820
|-
| 
|  | George F. Strother (DR)
| style="font-size:80%" | Resigned February 10, 1820
|  | Thomas L. Moore (DR)
| Seated November 13, 1820
|-
| 
|  | David Walker (DR)
| style="font-size:80%" | Died March 1, 1820
|  | Francis Johnson (DR)
| Seated November 13, 1820
|-
| 
|  | John Holmes (DR)
| style="font-size:80%" | Resigned March 15, 1820, to become U.S. Senator from Maine.
| District moved to Maine
| District inactive until 1903
|-
| 
| New seat
| style="font-size:80%" | Massachusetts's 14th district became Maine's at-large district
|  | Joseph Dane (F)
|  Seated November 6, 1820
|-
| 
|  | Jonathan Mason (F)
| style="font-size:80%" | Resigned May 15, 1820
|  | Benjamin Gorham (DR)
| Seated November 27, 1820
|-
| 
|  | David Fullerton (DR)
| style="font-size:80%" | Resigned May 15, 1820
|  | Thomas G. McCullough (F)
| rowspan= 4 | Seated November 13, 1820
|-
| 
|  | Edward Dowse (DR)
| style="font-size:80%" | Resigned May 26, 1820
|  | William Eustis (DR)
|-
| 
|  | Tunstall Quarles (DR)
| style="font-size:80%" | Resigned June 15, 1820
|  | Thomas Montgomery (DR)
|-
| 
|  | James Pindall (F)
| style="font-size:80%" | Resigned July 26, 1820
|  | Edward B. Jackson (DR)
|-
| 
|  | Zabdiel Sampson (DR)
| style="font-size:80%" | Resigned July 26, 1820
|  | Aaron Hobart (DR)
| Seated December 18, 1820

|-
| 
| William Woodbridge
| style="font-size:80%" | Resigned August 9, 1820
| Solomon Sibley
| Seated November 20, 1820
|-
| 
|  | Joseph Hiester (DR)
| style="font-size:80%" | Resigned sometime in December 1820
|  | Daniel Udree (DR)
| Seated January 8, 1821
|-
| 
|  | Nathaniel Hazard (DR)
| style="font-size:80%" | Died December 17, 1820
| Vacant
| Not filled in this Congress
|-
| 
|  | Jesse Slocumb (F)
| style="font-size:80%" | Died December 20, 1820
|  | William S. Blackledge (DR)
| Seated February 7, 1821
|-
| 
|  | John Linn (DR)
| style="font-size:80%" | Died January 5, 1821
| Vacant
| Not filled in this Congress
|-
| 
|  | Willard Hall (DR)
| style="font-size:80%" | Resigned January 22, 1821
| Vacant
| Not filled in this Congress
|-
| 
|  | William A. Burwell (DR)
| style="font-size:80%" | Died February 16, 1821
| Vacant
| Not filled in this Congress
|}

Committees
Lists of committees and their party leaders.

Senate

 Amendments to the Constitution (Select) 
 American Colonization Society (Select) 
 Audit and Control the Contingent Expenses of the Senate (Chairman: Jonathan Roberts)
 Claims (Chairman: Jonathan Roberts then James J. Wilson)
 Commerce and Manufactures (Chairman: Nathan Sanford then Mahlon Dickerson)
 Constitution of the State of Alabama (Select) 
 District of Columbia (Chairman: Outerbridge Horsey)
 Engrossed Bills (Chairman: Prentiss Mellen)
 Finance (Chairman: Nathan Sanford)
 Foreign Relations (Chairman: James Brown then James Barbour)
 Indian Affairs (Chairman: David Holmes)
 Judiciary (Chairman: William Smith)
 Land Commissioner Reports (Select) 
 Military Affairs (Chairman: John Williams)
 Militia (Chairman: James Noble)
 Missouri's Admission to the Union (Select) 
 Naval Affairs (Chairman: James Pleasants)
 Pensions (Chairman: Nicholas Van Dyke then James Noble)
 Post Office and Post Roads (Chairman: Montfort Stokes)
 Public Buildings (Select) 
 Public Lands (Chairman: Thomas Hill Williams then Jesse B. Thomas)
 Purchase of Fire Engines (Select) 
 Reduction of Congressional Salaries (Select) 
 Roads and Canals (Select) (Chairman: Rufus King)
 Whole

House of Representatives

 Accounts (Chairman: James S. Smith)
 Agriculture (Chairman: Thomas Forrest)
 Apportionment of Representatives (Select) 
 Army Appropriations Inquiry (Select) 
 Bank of the United States (Select) 
 Brownstown Treaty (Select) 
 Claims (Chairman: Lewis Williams)
 Commerce (Chairman: Thomas Newton Jr.)
 District of Columbia (Chairman: Joseph Kent)
 Elections (Chairman: John W. Taylor then David Trimble)
 Expenditures in the Navy Department (Chairman: Stevenson Archer)
 Expenditures in the Post Office Department (Chairman: Arthur Livermore)
 Expenditures in the State Department (Chairman: John Holmes)
 Expenditures in the Treasury Department (Chairman: David Trimble)
 Expenditures in the War Department (Chairman: Henry Brush)
 Expenditures on Public Buildings (Chairman: Henry Meigs)
 Judiciary (Chairman: John Sergeant)
 Manufactures (Chairman: Henry Baldwin)
 Pensions and Revolutionary Claims (Chairman: John Rhea)
 Post Office and Post Roads (Chairman: Arthur Livermore)
 Private Land Claims (Chairman: John W. Campbell)
 Public Expenditures (Chairman: Eldred Simkins) 
 Public Lands (Chairman: Richard C. Anderson)
 Revisal and Unfinished Business (Chairman: Marcus Morton)
 Rules (Select) 
 Standards of Official Conduct 
 Ways and Means (Chairman: Samuel Smith)
 Whole

Joint committees

 Enrolled Bills 
 Investigate Safety of Roofs over Senate and House Wings of the Capitol
 The Library

Officers

Legislative branch agency directors 
Architect of the Capitol: Charles Bulfinch
Librarian of Congress: George Watterston

Senate 
 Chaplain: John Clark (Presbyterian), until December 9, 1819
 Reuben Post (Presbyterian), elected December 9, 1819
 William Ryland (Methodist), elected November 17, 1820
 Secretary: Charles Cutts
 Sergeant at Arms: Mountjoy Bayly

House of Representatives 
 Chaplain: Burgiss Allison (Baptist), until November 16, 1820
 John N. Campbell (Presbyterian), elected November 16, 1820
 Clerk: Thomas Dougherty
 Doorkeeper: Thomas Claxton
 Reading Clerks: 
 Sergeant at Arms: Thomas Dunn

See also 
 1818 United States elections (elections leading to this Congress)
 1818–19 United States Senate elections
 1818–19 United States House of Representatives elections
 1820 United States elections (elections during this Congress, leading to the next Congress)
 1820 United States presidential election
 1820–21 United States Senate elections
 1820–21 United States House of Representatives elections

Notes

References

External links
Statutes at Large, 1789–1875
Senate Journal, First Forty-three Sessions of Congress
House Journal, First Forty-three Sessions of Congress
Biographical Directory of the U.S. Congress
U.S. House of Representatives: House History
U.S. Senate: Statistics and Lists